Lubudi Airport  is an airport serving the town of Lubudi in Lualaba Province, Democratic Republic of the Congo.

See also

Transport in the Democratic Republic of the Congo
 List of airports in the Democratic Republic of the Congo

References

External links
 FallingRain - Lubudi
 
 HERE Maps - Lubudi
 OpenStreetMap - Lubudi
 OurAirports - Lubudi

Airports in Lualaba Province